Higan is a free emulator for multiple video game consoles, including the Super Nintendo Entertainment System. Originally called bsnes (which was later reused for a new emulator by the same developer), the emulator is notable for attempting to emulate the original hardware as accurately as possible through low-level, cycle-accurate emulation and for the associated historical preservation efforts of the Super NES platform.

higan products family 

Higan has been forked and renamed over the years, and consists of three sub-projects.

The current sub-projects are:
bsnes: A Super NES emulator with Super Game Boy support.
higan: A multi-system emulator that focuses on accuracy. Supported systems include the NES, Super NES, Game Boy (Color), Game Boy Advance, SG-1000 and SC-3000, Master System, Game Gear, Genesis, Sega CD, PC Engine (SuperGrafx), MSX and MSX2, ColecoVision, WonderSwan (Color), and Neo Geo Pocket (Color).
ares: A multi-system emulator that is a fork of higan, focusing on performance and adding experimental PlayStation and Nintendo 64 support in addition to the systems supported in higan.

Overview 

Development of the emulator began with the name bsnes on October 14, 2004. The first version was released in May 2005 for Microsoft Windows. The early versions would require high-power hardware to run games in a consistent manner and therefore garnered controversy. Since then, it has been ported to Linux, macOS, and FreeBSD. Initially developed under a custom license, later releases were licensed under various versions of the GNU General Public License. On August 9, 2012, the project was renamed to higan, to better reflect its new nature as a multi-system emulator.

The higan project has contributed significantly to the field of Super NES emulation, with a number of original achievements in its emulation, and in reverse engineering developments such as the organization of funds, hardware, and expertise for decapping the Super NES's enhancement chips.

Higan is able to run every commercial Super NES title ever released. It is the first emulator to have featured SPC7110 emulation, cycle-accurate SPC 700 emulation, cycle-accurate Super FX emulation, Super Game Boy emulation, and a dot-based instead of scanline-based renderer for the Game Boy Advance. It is the first multi-emulator of this breadth to achieve cycle-based emulation for every single component of every system.

Forked versions of bsnes have provided emulation support for Nintendo DS, XBAND, Super Famicom Box, Satellaview BS-X software, and tool-assisted speedruns.

Author 
Higan was developed by American software engineer David Kirk Ginder (February 21, 1983 - June 27, 2021), known as Near and formerly as byuu. Near started out in the emulation scene as an amateur programmer, translating Japanese video-game ROM images at the age of 14, and one year later developed a tool for displaying resized text font in games. After that, a patching assembler called "xas" would follow, which streamlined the ROM-translation process. The development of bsnes was triggered by bugs during translation of Super Famicom game Der Langrisser that would only appear on the original hardware but not on 2004-era Super NES emulators; as such, the aim of bsnes was for accurate emulation.

Near contributed to the translation of the Nintendo RPG Mother 3 and to the improvement of the emulator Snes9x. They also engaged extensively in creating faithful copies of Super NES games for preservation.

In 2019, Near retreated from the emulation scene, after "a series of escalating privacy intrusions and targeted Internet harassment" affected their mental health.

In February 2021, Near released a new translation for the Super Famicom game Bahamut Lagoon, a passion project that they had attempted multiple times since 1998. This is also the game where Near's former pseudonym of byuu comes from.

On June 27, 2021, Near posted a suicide note on Twitter, claiming that they had faced extensive harassment from the website Kiwi Farms. Héctor Martín Cantero later announced he had confirmed Near's death with the police. One month later, their death was confirmed by their employer to USA Today. Near was 38 years old and identified as non-binary.

Reception 

In 2008, British Internet magazine Webuser recommended bsnes for "some fun old-school gaming". In 2009, Japanese game magazine GameLabo recommended it for "those seeking a realistic playing experience".

In 2017, components of higan's source code were used to emulate the vintage text-to-speech computer used by physicist Stephen Hawking, after the original hardware began showing signs of wear. Hawking would continue using this emulator to converse with others until his death in 2018.

See also 
 List of Super NES emulators

References

External links 

 higan source code repository
 bsnes source code repository
 Linux packages for various distributions
 arstechnica.com article by the author on the state of Higan in 2011

Cross-platform free software
Free software programmed in C++
Super Nintendo Entertainment System emulators
Free video game console emulators
Windows emulation software
MacOS emulation software
Linux emulation software
Multi-emulators